Genuity may refer to:

 Canaccord Genuity, Canadian financial company
 Genuity (Monsanto brand), a brand of genetically modified products from Monsanto
 Genuity (Internet company), an internet business owned by Level 3 Communications

See also
 Genuity Championship